GLSEN (pronounced glisten; formerly the Gay, Lesbian & Straight Education Network) is an American education organization working to end discrimination, harassment, and bullying based on sexual orientation, gender identity and gender expression and to prompt LGBT cultural inclusion and awareness in K-12 schools. Founded in 1990 in Boston, Massachusetts, the organization is now headquartered in New York City and has an office of public policy based in Washington, D.C.

 there are 39 GLSEN chapters across 26 states that train 5,000 students, educators, and school personnel each year. The chapters also support more than 4,000 registered school-based clubs—commonly known as gay–straight alliances (GSAs)--which work to address name-calling, bullying, and harassment in their schools.   GLSEN also sponsors and participates in a host of annual "Days of Action", including a No Name-Calling Week every January, a Day of Silence every April, and an Ally Week every September. Guided by research such as its National School Climate Survey, GLSEN has developed resources, lesson plans, classroom materials, and professional development programs for teachers on how to support LGBTQ students.

Research shows that in response to bullying and mistreatment, many LGBTQ students avoid school altogether; this can lead to academic failure. To combat this problem, GLSEN has advocated for LGBTQ-inclusive anti-bullying laws and policies. GLSEN has also worked with the U.S. Departments of Education, Justice, and Health and Human Services to create model policies that support LGBTQ students and educators. GLSEN has considered their signature legislation to be the Safe Schools Improvement Act and has been honored by the White House as a "Champion of Change".

History

1990s

1990 
 Kevin Jennings, a high school history teacher in Massachusetts, and Kathy Henderson, Assistant Athletic Director at Phillips Academy, Andover leads a coalition of gay and lesbian educators to form what was then called the Gay and Lesbian Independent School Teacher Network (GLISTN).

1993 
 In Massachusetts, the Governor's Commission released its report, Making Schools Safe for Gay and Lesbian Youth.

1994 
 GLSTN became a national organization with the founding of the first chapter outside Massachusetts in St. Louis.
 GLSTN launches the first LGBT History Month in October with official proclamations from the governors of Connecticut and Massachusetts.

1995 
 GLSTN hired its first full-time staffer, founder and Executive Director Kevin Jennings.
 GLSTN accredits chapters for the first time.

1996 
 GLSTN started annual celebration of Day of Silence.

1997 
 GLSTN staged its first national conference in Salt Lake City, Utah, in response to the legislature's effort to prevent the formation of GSAs in the state by banning all student groups. 
 GLSTN changed its name to GLSEN (the Gay, Lesbian, and Straight Education Network) in order to more reflect the importance of straight educators in shaping safe schools.
 Kevin Jennings meets with President Bill Clinton at the White House to discuss anti-LGBT bias in America's schools—the first meeting of its kind in the Executive Office of the United States.

1998 
 Out of the Past, a GLSEN-sponsored documentary developed as a resource for high school history classes, wins the Audience Award at the Sundance Film Festival and is broadcast nationally on PBS. Eliza Byard, the film's co-producer, would become GLSEN's Deputy Executive Director in 2001.

1999 
 GLSEN conducts the National School Climate Survey—the first and only national study regularly documenting the experiences of LGBT youth in schools.  The survey is conducted and published biennially.
 GLSEN, the American Academy of Pediatrics, and a coalition of national education, mental health, and religious organizations release Just the Facts about Sexual Orientation and Youth: A Primer for Principals, Educators and School Personnel, which provides authoritative statements about how "conversion therapy" is harmful to youth. Sixteen years later, President Barack Obama would call for an end to the practice.

2000s

2000 
 The Chicago chapter of GLSEN was inducted into the Chicago Gay and Lesbian Hall of Fame.

2001 
 Students ask GLSEN to become the first national sponsor of the Day of Silence. Participation grows from hundreds of college students to thousands of middle and high school youth.

2002 
 GLSEN begins a partnership with the National Education Association, which asks school districts to protect LGBTQ students and staff by adopting policies that protect students from bullying and harassment on the basis of sexual orientation and gender identity/expression.

2003 
 U.S. Representative Linda Sánchez introduces the Safe Schools Improvement Act, an LGBT-inclusive federal anti-bullying bill that includes protections for sexual orientation and gender identity/expression.

2004 
 GLSEN's No Name-Calling Week launches as an annual week of educational activities aimed at ending name-calling of all kinds. 
 Vermont becomes the first state to pass an LGBT-inclusive anti-bullying law that includes protections on the basis of sexual orientation and gender identity/expression.

2005 
 GLSEN and Harris Interactive release From Teasing to Torment: School Climate in America, A Survey of Students and Teachers, the first national study of the general population of secondary students and teachers to address LGBT issues. This study documents disparities between LGBTQ and non-LGBTQ students and finds that LGBT students were more than three times as likely to not feel safe at school. 
 GLSEN's Jump-Start National Student Leadership Team develops an idea that turns into the first Ally Week that is now in schools nationwide every October.

2006 
 GLSEN launches the "Think Before You Speak" public service announcement initiative with the Ad Council, the nonprofit advertising company's first LGBT-focused campaign.

2007 
 GLSEN helps develop the New York City Department of Education's "Respect for All" initiative.

2008 
 Lawrence King is murdered by his eighth-grade classmate at E.O. Green Junior High in Oxnard, California. GLSEN's Day of Silence is held in Larry's honor as students from more than 8,000 schools participate. 
 Lance Bass films a public service announcement in the GLSEN office that is viewed more than 300,000 times on YouTube.
 GLSEN releases, The Principal's Perspective: School Safety, Bullying and Harassment, a report conducted in collaboration with the National Association of Secondary School Principals.

2009 
 Eleven-year-old Carl Joseph Walker-Hoover takes his life after enduring anti-gay bullying at school. His mother, Sirdeaner Walker, becomes a GLSEN spokesperson and later joins GLSEN's National Board of Directors.
 GLSEN releases Harsh Realities: The Experiences of Transgender Youth in Our Nation's Schools, the organization's first report that focuses specifically on the experiences of transgender students. The study finds that transgender youth face much higher levels of harassment and violence than LGB cisgender students, and as a result, miss more school, receive lower grades and feel more isolated from their school community.
 GLSEN releases Shared Differences: The Experiences of Lesbian, Gay, Bisexual and Transgender Students of Color in our Nation's Schools. The study focuses specifically on the school experiences of LGBTQ students of color and provides insight into the ways in which LGBTQ students' school experiences differ based on race or ethnicity. The report finds that the majority of LGBTQ students of color faced both LGBTQ-based harassment and race-based harassment at school.

2010s

2010 
 GLSEN officially launches the Safe Space Campaign, designed to give educators the tools to be visibly supportive allies to LGBTQ students. The campaign goes on to place a Safe Space Kit in every school in the United States.

2011 
 GLSEN's Executive Director Eliza Byard participates in the first-ever United Nations international consultation to address anti-LGBT bullying in schools.
 Several representatives from GLSEN attend the White House Conference on Bullying Prevention, pressing for effective federal action to address bullying, and highlighting bullying prevention programs and approaches that benefit all students.
 The White House names GLSEN a "Champion of Change", honoring the organization's two decades of work to fight bullying, violence, and stigma directed at LGBTQ people in K-12 schools and for GLSEN's efforts to prevent suicide among at-risk youth.
 GLSEN, the Anti-Defamation League, and National Public Radio's StoryCorps launch "Unheard Voices", an oral history and curriculum project that will help educators integrate LGBTQ history, people and issues into their instructional programs.

2012 
 GLSEN releases Strengths and Silences: The Experiences of Lesbian, Gay, Bisexual and Transgender Students in Rural and Small Town Schools. The report documents the experiences of more than 2,300 LGBTQ students who attend secondary schools in rural areas. Findings demonstrate that compared to LGBTQ students in urban and suburban areas, LGBTQ students in rural schools are more likely to hear negative comments about gender expression and sexual orientation; feel unsafe at their schools due to their sexual orientation, gender identity, or gender expression, and experience verbal and physical harassment and assault due to these characteristics.
 A GuideStar/Philanthropedia survey of 110 experts on LGBTQ issues names GLSEN one of the country's top three LGBTQ nonprofits making significant contributions on a national level.
 GLSEN partners with the leading school mental health professional associations, the National Association of School Psychologists, the American School Counselors Association, the School Social Workers Association of America, and the American Council for School Social Workers, to conduct a national study of school mental health professionals on their preparation and practices related to LGBTQ youth in schools.

2013 
 GLSEN convenes first-ever research symposia on LGBTQ students' experiences and homophobic and transphobic bullying internationally at the World Comparative Education Congress in Buenos Aires, Argentina – with more than 15 countries, including Australia, Brazil, Canada, Chile, China, Cyprus, Israel, Ireland, Italy, Mexico, the Netherlands, Nigeria, Poland, Slovenia, South Africa, and Turkey. GLSEN, in partnership with UNESCO, also coordinates an all-day strategic planning meeting with the global group of experts to coordinate collective resources and reduce homophobic and transphobic prejudice and violence in schools globally.
 GLSEN publishes Out Online: The Experiences of Lesbian, Gay, Bisexual and Transgender Youth, the first national report to examine the online experience of LGBTQ youth. While LGBTQ youth experience nearly three times as much bullying and harassment online, they also find greater peer support, access to health information, and opportunities to be civically engaged.
 Transgender Student Rights, a youth-created grassroots organization, becomes a GLSEN program.
 By youth nomination, GLSEN Executive Director Dr. Eliza Byard speaks at the Let Freedom Ring Commemoration and Call to Action event at the Lincoln Memorial, where Martin Luther King Jr. delivered his famous "I Have a Dream" speech in 1963. Fellow speakers include Presidents Obama, Bill Clinton, and Jimmy Carter. GLSEN is the only representative from an LGBTQ organization to speak at the event.

2014 
 GLSEN partners with the American Association of Colleges for Teacher Education and the Association of Teacher Educators to research and support the inclusion of LGBTQ issues in teacher preparation.
 The Office for Civil Rights in the U.S. Department of Education issues official guidance making clear that transgender students are protected from discrimination under Title IX, stating that "Title IX's sex discrimination prohibition extends to claims of discrimination based on gender identity or failure to conform to stereotypical notions of masculinity or femininity."
 The GLSEN National School Climate Survey finds that school climate for LGBTQ students has improved somewhat over the years, yet remains quite hostile for many. LGBTQ students in the survey experienced lower verbal and physical harassment based on sexual orientation than in all prior years, and the lowest physical assault based on sexual orientation since 2007. 
 The Safe Schools Improvement Act, federal legislation that would require schools to adopt LGBTQ-inclusive anti-bullying policies, garners its highest support yet, with 208 bipartisan co-sponsors in the U.S. House of Representatives and 46 in the U.S. Senate.

2015 
 GLSEN's No Name-Calling Week generates nearly 1,000,000 impressions of #celebratekindness on Twitter. 
 GLSEN and Chilean partner organization Todo Mejora release a Spanish-language version of the GLSEN Safe Space Kit to be used in Chilean schools.

2020s

2022 
 GLSEN appoints Melanie Willingham-Jaggers as the organization's first Black and non-binary executive director.

Campaigns and programs

GLSEN's Day of Silence 

GLSEN's Day of Silence is a national day of action that began at the University of Virginia in 1996 in which students vow to take a form of silence to call attention to the silencing effect of anti-LGBTQ bullying and harassment in schools. GLSEN's Day of Silence takes place in 8,000 U.S. schools every year and has spread to more than 60 countries.

GLSEN's No Name-Calling Week 
Every January, thousands of elementary and middle schools participate in GLSEN's No Name-Calling Week to end bullying. No Name-Calling Week was inspired by the popular young adult novel entitled The Misfits by popular author James Howe, and is supported by over 60 national partner organizations.

GLSEN's Ally Week 

Every fall, GLSEN's Ally Week serves to educate allies about the role they play in creating safer spaces for LGBTQ youth. Ally Week was started in 2005 by GLSEN's Jump-Start National Student Leadership team.  Ally Week is supported by over 20 endorsers.

Think Before You Speak campaign 

On October 8, 2008, GLSEN and Ad Council released the Think Before You Speak campaign, designed to end homophobic vocabulary and raise awareness about the prevalence and consequences of anti-LGBTQ bias and behavior in America's schools among youth, through the use of television, radio, print, and outdoor ads.
The campaign also aimed to raise awareness among adults, school personnel, and parents.  It includes three television public service announcements (PSAs), six print PSAs and three radio PSAs. Television commercials for the campaign include singer Hilary Duff as well as comedian Wanda Sykes. In 2008 the campaign won the Ad Council's Gold Bell award for "Best Public Service Advertising Campaign".

GLSEN Research 
GLSEN has been conducting research and evaluation on LGBTQ issues in K-12 education since 1999. GLSEN became the only organization to regularly document the school experiences of lesbian, gay, bisexual, transgender, and queer (LGBTQ) middle and high school students in the U.S. using GLSEN's National School Climate Survey.  Other research reports GLSEN has put out include From Statehouse to Schoolhouse: Anti-Bullying Policies in U.S. States and School Districts, Shared Differences: The Experiences of LGBTQ Students of Color in Our Nation's Schools,  Harsh Realities: The Experiences of Transgender Youth in Our Nation's Schools, as well as many other reports, articles, and book chapters.

GLSEN National Student Council 
The GLSEN National Student Council, formerly known as the Student Ambassadors program, is one of GLSEN's student leadership teams. Each year, GLSEN selects a small group of middle and high school students to serve as GLSEN youth representatives for the upcoming school year. Students of the National Student Council advise GLSEN on campaigns, bring GLSEN resources to their schools, represent GLSEN in the media, and have their own work published in local and national outlets.

GLSEN Chapters
GLSEN Chapters, with the support and guidance of the national office, work to bring GLSEN programs to their specific communities on a local level. Chapter board members and volunteers are students, educators, parents and community members who volunteer their time to support students and Gay-Straight Alliances, train educators and provide opportunities for everyone to make change in their local schools. GLSEN has 38 volunteer-led GLSEN Chapters in 26 states that work with student leaders, provide professional development for educators, and encourage policymakers to enact LGBTQ-inclusive policies.

GLSEN Respect Awards
GLSEN organizes the annual GLSEN Respect Awards to honor leaders, personalities, and organizations who have made significant contributions to LGBTQ youth. Awards are given to organizations, celebrities, students, educators and gay–straight alliances. Since 2004, there have been over four dozen honorees and over $15 million raised in all. The first Respect Awards were in New York in 2004 and honored Andrew Tobias, author and Treasurer of the Democratic National Committee; MTV; and student Marina Gatto. Since then, the Respect Awards are held annually in New York in late May and in Los Angeles in late October. Since 2004, there have been over four-dozen honorees and over $17 million raised.

Fistgate controversy 

In 2000, the leader of the conservative Parents' Rights Coalition of Massachusetts (now known as MassResistance) secretly taped one of the 50 workshops in "Teachout 2000", titled "What They Didn't Tell You About Queer Sex and Sexuality in Health Class: Workshop for Youth Only, Ages 14–21". Students discussed sex in a workshop "billed as a safe place for youths to get their questions about their sexuality answered" in the session's Q&A section.  A question was asked about fisting a minor and an explanation was provided.  Greg Carmack subsequently suggested that the question might have been planted by those making the recordings.  MassResistance dubbed the incident "Fistgate" and the tapes generated controversy when they were broadcast over radio.   A state employee who participated in the discussion and was subsequently dismissed filed suit against Camenker and Scott Whiteman as a result of the distribution of the tape recordings, while others pointed out the legal prohibition against recording people without their knowledge or permission.  According to Bay Windows, a "Massachusetts Superior Court judge ruled that the tape was illegally acquired and therefore an invasion of privacy against those individuals present, who were never told they were being recorded."

See also

 LGBT rights in the United States
 List of LGBT rights organizations

References

External links
 
 No Name Calling Week
 Think Before You Speak Campaign
 GLSEN's Day of Silence
 Chapters

Anti-bullying organizations in the United States
Education in the United States
LGBT and education
LGBT political advocacy groups in the United States
LGBT youth organizations based in the United States
Organizations established in 1990
1990 establishments in Massachusetts